Inman is a city in McPherson County, Kansas, United States.  As of the 2020 census, the population of the city was 1,341.

History 

For millennia, the land now known as Kansas was inhabited by Native Americans.  In 1803, most of modern Kansas was secured by the United States as part of the Louisiana Purchase.  In 1854, the Kansas Territory was organized, then in 1861 Kansas became the 34th U.S. state.  In 1867, McPherson County was founded.

It was founded in 1887 as Aiken.

In 1887, the Chicago, Kansas and Nebraska Railway built a main line from Herington through Inman to Pratt.  In 1888, this line was extended to Liberal.  Later, it was extended to Tucumcari, New Mexico and El Paso, Texas.  It foreclosed in 1891 and taken over by Chicago, Rock Island and Pacific Railway, which shut down in 1980 and reorganized as Oklahoma, Kansas and Texas Railroad, merged in 1988 with Missouri Pacific Railroad, merged in 1997 with Union Pacific Railroad.  Most locals still refer to this railroad as the "Rock Island".

Geography 
Inman is located at  (38.230355, -97.772773).

Climate
The climate in this area is characterized by hot, humid summers and generally mild to cool winters.  According to the Köppen Climate Classification system, Inman has a humid subtropical climate, abbreviated "Cfa" on climate maps.

Demographics

2010 census
As of the census of 2010, there were 1,377 people, 513 households, and 347 families residing in the city. The racial makeup of the city was 96.0% White, 0.1% African American, 0.4% Native American, 0.3% Asian, 0.7% from other races, and 2.5% from two or more races. Hispanic or Latino of any race were 3.1% of the population.

There were 513 households, of which 31.0% had children under the age of 18 living with them, 59.6% were married couples living together, 5.7% had a female householder with no husband present, 2.3% had a male householder with no wife present, and 32.4% were non-families. 29.4% of all households were made up of individuals, and 19.5% had someone living alone who was 65 years of age or older. The average household size was 2.45 and the average family size was 3.04.

The median age in the city was 45.2 years. 23.5% of residents were under the age of 18; 6.6% were between the ages of 18 and 24; 19.7% were from 25 to 44; 20% were from 45 to 64; and 30.1% were 65 years of age or older. The gender makeup of the city was 47.1% male and 52.9% female.

2000 census
As of the census of 2000, there were 1,142 people, 494 households, and 334 families residing in the city. The racial makeup of the city was 98.42% White, 0.35% Native American, 0.44% from other races, and 0.79% from two or more races. Hispanic or Latino of any race were 1.40% of the population.

There were 494 households, out of which 27.1% had children under the age of 18 living with them, 61.3% were married couples living together, 4.9% had a female householder with no husband present, and 32.2% were non-families. 30.2% of all households were made up of individuals, and 21.7% had someone living alone who was 65 years of age or older. The average household size was 2.31 and the average family size was 2.87.

In the city, the population was spread out, with 24.3% under the age of 18, 7.2% from 18 to 24, 22.4% from 25 to 44, 16.7% from 45 to 64, and 29.3% who were 65 years of age or older. The median age was 42 years. For every 100 females, there were 93.6 males. For every 100 females age 18 and over, there were 88.2 males.

The median income for a household in the city was US$31,648, and the median income for a family was $40,804. Males had a median income of $31,875 versus $19,615 for females. The per capita income for the city was $17,290. About 2.9% of families and 5.7% of the population were below the poverty line, including 6.2% of those under age 18 and 6.1% of those age 65 or over.

Education
The community is served by Inman USD 448 public school district.  Inman has two schools:
 Inman Jr-Sr High School
 Inman Elementary School

Sports
The Inman Teutons have won the following Kansas State High School championships:
 1947 Boys Basketball - Class B 
 1956 Boys Basketball - Class B 
 1967 Boys Basketball - Class B 
 1967 Boys Track & Field (Indoor) - Class B 
 1971 Boys Track & Field (Indoor) - Class 2A 
 1989 Girls Volleyball - Class 2A 
 1993 Girls Basketball - Class 2A 
 1994 Boys Basketball - Class 2A 
 1994 Girls Volleyball - Class 2A

Notable people
Dean Wade, basketball player

See also
 List of people from McPherson County, Kansas
 Threshing Stone
 Santa Fe Trail

References

Further reading

 A Centennial History, Inman, Kansas, 1887-1987; Inman Heritage Association; 1987.
 Hoffnungsau in Kansas ; A.J. Dyck; Mennonite Life; October 1949.

External links

 
 Inman - Directory of Public Officials, League of Kansas Municipalities
 Historic Images of Inman, Special Photo Collections at Wichita State University Library
 Inman city map, KDOT

Cities in Kansas
Cities in McPherson County, Kansas
Populated places established in 1887
1887 establishments in Kansas